The  2011–12 season of the Turkish Women's First Football League is the 16th season of Turkey's premier women's football league. Ataşehir Belediyespor is the champion of the season.

Teams

Season

First stage

Group A

Results

Group B

Results

Second stage

Championship Group

Results

Relegation Group

Results

Knockout stage

Semi-finals

Third Place

Final

External links
 Kadınlar 1. Ligi 2011-2012 Sezonu 

2011
2011–12 domestic women's association football leagues
Women's